Manor High School may refer to:

England
 Manor High School, Oadby, Leicestershire
 Manor Academy (formerly Manor High School), Sale, Greater Manchester
 St Michael's Church of England High School, Crosby (formerly Manor High School), Merseyside
 The Manor School (formerly Manor Comprehensive) in Mansfield Woodhouse, Nottinghamshire

United States
 Bohemia Manor High School, Chesapeake City, Maryland
 Eastport-South Manor Central School District, New York
 Mountain Manor, a high school in Baltimore, Maryland
 Penn Manor High School, Millersville, Pennsylvania
 Woodrow Wilson High School (Portsmouth, Virginia), formerly known as Manor High School
 Manor High School, Manor, Texas

See also
 Manor (disambiguation)
 Minor High School, Adamsville, Alabama